BBC Radio Newcastle is the BBC's local radio station serving Newcastle upon Tyne, the neighbouring metropolitan boroughs, Northumberland and north east County Durham. It broadcasts on FM, DAB, digital TV and via BBC Sounds from BBC studios on Barrack Road, Newcastle upon Tyne.

According to RAJAR, the station has a weekly audience of 192,000 listeners and a 4.6% share as of December 2022.

Technical 

The  frequency from Chatton covers most of the populated areas of east Northumberland. The other two FM transmitters are much weaker.

The Fenham transmitter, for west Newcastle and Gateshead is situated close to the studios on Barrack Road. 

The DAB signal comes mainly from Burnhope (near Consett), and also from Fenham (lower power), on the Bauer Digital Radio multiplex.

In addition, BBC Radio Newcastle also broadcasts on Freeview TV channel 719 and streams online via BBC Sounds.

Programming
Local programming is produced and broadcast from the BBC Radio Newcastle's studios from 6am - 1am each day.

The station's late show, airing from 10pm - 1am, is simulcast every night on BBC Radio Tees and on BBC Radio Cumbria on Fridays.

During the station's downtime, BBC Radio Newcastle simulcasts overnight programming from BBC Radio 5 Live and BBC Radio London.

Presenters
The station's team of sports commentators includes Gary Bennett, Marco Gabbiadini, Matthew Raisbeck and John Anderson.

BBC Radio Sunderland
In January 2021, BBC Radio Sunderland launched as a temporary sister station. The service provided eight hours of opt-out programming for listeners in Sunderland and the surrounding area each weekday until March 2021.

Notable former presenters

 Alex Hall
Lisa Shaw (deceased)
 Frank Wappat
 Sue Sweeney
 Paddy MacDee
 Kathy Secker
 Alfie Joey

References

External links 

 media.info - BBC Radio Newcastle
 History of local radio in Tyneside and Northumberland
 Chatton transmitter
 Fenham transmitter
 Newton transmitter
 Pontop Pike transmitter (including coverage map)

Newcastle
Mass media in Newcastle upon Tyne
Radio stations in North East England
Radio stations established in 1971
1971 establishments in England